This is a list of films released in 1995. The highly anticipated sequel Die Hard with a Vengeance was the year's biggest box-office hit, and Braveheart won the Academy Award for Best Picture. Gaumont celebrate its centennary in 1995.

Highest-grossing films

The top 10 films released in 1995 by worldwide gross are as follows:

Events
 March 13 – The Dogme 95 movement is officially announced in Paris by Danish directors Lars von Trier and Thomas Vinterberg.
 April 10 – Matsushita Electric Industrial Co. sells 80% of MCA Inc., owner of Universal Pictures, to Seagram Company for $7 billion.
 May 19 – Die Hard With a Vengeance is released in theaters and becomes the year's highest-grossing film (Toy Story overtook it in re-releases in 2014)
 May 24 – Braveheart is released to critical and commercial success. Directed by and starring Mel Gibson, it will go on to win 5 Academy Awards, including Best Picture and Best Director.
 May 27 – Actor Christopher Reeve injures his spinal cord after falling off his horse in an equestrian competition. The injury paralyzed him from the shoulders down, and he depended on a ventilator to breathe. 
 June 10 – Pocahontas has the largest premiere ever for a movie, premiering in Central Park, New York City, with an audience of 100,000 and free admission. The film received mixed reviews but was a commercial success at the worldwide box office.
 November – Carolco Pictures files for Chapter 11 bankruptcy protection.
 November 17 – After a six-year hiatus, the James Bond film series resumes with the successful GoldenEye with Pierce Brosnan as James Bond.
 November 22 – Toy Story is released, marking the first feature-length film created completely using computer-generated imagery. Toy Story was both a commercial and critical success, and is considered by film historians as a significant turning point in film history.

Awards

1995 wide-release films

January–March

April–June

July–September

October–December

Notable films released in 1995
United States unless stated

#
12 Monkeys, directed by Terry Gilliam, starring Bruce Willis, Madeleine Stowe, Brad Pitt
301, 302, directed by Park Chul-soo – (South Korea)

A
Above Suspicion, starring Christopher Reeve, Joe Mantegna, Kim Cattrall
Ace Ventura: When Nature Calls, directed by Steve Oedekerk, starring Jim Carrey
The Addiction, directed by Abel Ferrara, starring Lili Taylor and Christopher Walken
After Five in the Forest Primeval (Nach Fünf im Urwald), starring Franka Potente – (Germany)
All Things Fair (Lust och fägring stor), directed by Bo Widerberg – (Sweden)
The Amazing Panda Adventure
The American President, directed by Rob Reiner, starring Michael Douglas, Annette Bening, Martin Sheen, Richard Dreyfuss, Michael J. Fox
Angel Baby, starring John Lynch – (Australia)
Angels & Insects, starring Mark Rylance and Kristin Scott Thomas – (UK/US)
Angus, starring Charlie Talbert, James Van Der Beek, Kathy Bates and George C. Scott
Antonia's Line (Antonia) – (Netherlands) – Academy Award for Best Foreign Language Film
L'Appât (Fresh Bait or The Bait), directed by Bertrand Tavernier – (France) – Golden Bear award
Apollo 13, directed by Ron Howard, starring Tom Hanks, Kevin Bacon, Bill Paxton, Gary Sinise, Ed Harris
The Arsonist (Kaki bakar) – (Malaysia)
Assassins, directed by Richard Donner, starring Sylvester Stallone, Antonio Banderas, Julianne Moore
An Awfully Big Adventure, directed by Mike Newell, starring Alan Rickman and Hugh Grant – (U.K.)

B
Babe – Golden Globe Award for Best Picture (Musical or Comedy), directed by Chris Noonan – (United States/Australia)
The Baby-Sitters Club
Bad Boys, directed by Michael Bay, starring Martin Lawrence and Will Smith
Balto – animated film by Universal Studios and Amblin Entertainment
The Basketball Diaries, starring Leonardo DiCaprio
Batman Forever, directed by Joel Schumacher, starring Val Kilmer, Tommy Lee Jones, Jim Carrey, Nicole Kidman, Chris O'Donnell
Before Sunrise, starring Ethan Hawke and Julie Delpy – (United States/Austria/Switzerland)
Between the Devil and the Deep Blue Sea, starring Stephen Rea – (Belgium/France)
Beyond Rangoon, directed by John Boorman, starring Patricia Arquette
Beyond the Clouds (Al di là delle nuvole) or (Par-dela les nuages), directed by Michelangelo Antonioni, starring John Malkovich and Sophie Marceau – (Italy/France/Germany)
The Big Green, starring Steve Guttenberg
Billy Madison, directed by Tamra Davis, starring Adam Sandler, Bridgette Wilson, Bradley Whitford, Darren McGavin
The Blade (Gao), directed by Tsui Hark – (Hong Kong)
Blue in the Face, starring Harvey Keitel, Lou Reed and Michael J. Fox
The Blue Villa (Un bruit qui rend fou), starring Fred Ward – (France)
Blush (Hong Fen) – (China)
Boca a boca, starring Javier Bardem – (Spain)
Bombay, starring Arvind Swamy – (India)
Born to Be Wild, starring Wil Horneff, Helen Shaver, John C. McGinley, Peter Boyle
Boys on the Side, starring Whoopi Goldberg, Mary-Louise Parker, Drew Barrymore
The Brady Bunch Movie, directed by Betty Thomas, starring Gary Cole and Shelley Long
Braveheart, directed by and starring Mel Gibson, with Sophie Marceau, Patrick McGoohan – Academy Award for Best Picture
The Bridges of Madison County, directed by and starring Clint Eastwood, with Meryl Streep
Brother of Sleep (Schlafes Bruder) – (Germany)
The Brothers McMullen, directed by and starring Edward Burns
Bugis Street (Yao jie huang hou), directed by Yonfan – (Singapore/Hong Kong)
Butterfly Kiss, directed by Michael Winterbottom, starring Amanda Plummer and Saskia Reeves – (U.K.)
Bye-Bye – (France)
Bye Bye Love, starring Matthew Modine, Randy Quaid and Paul Reiser

C
Canadian Bacon, directed by Michael Moore, starring John Candy, Alan Alda, Rip Torn, Bill Nunn, Rhea Perlman
Carlota Joaquina – Princesa do Brasil – (Brazil)
Carrington, starring Emma Thompson and Jonathan Pryce – (U.K.)
Casino, directed by Martin Scorsese and starring Robert De Niro, Joe Pesci, Sharon Stone
Casper, directed by Brad Silberling, starring Bill Pullman, Christina Ricci, Cathy Moriarty, Eric Idle, with Malachi Pearson as Casper
The Celluloid Closet, narrated by Lily Tomlin
La Cérémonie, directed by Claude Chabrol, starring Isabelle Huppert and Jacqueline Bisset – (France)
Circle of Friends, starring Chris O'Donnell and Minnie Driver – (Ireland)
Citizen X, starring Stephen Rea, Donald Sutherland and Max von Sydow
The City of Lost Children (La Cité des enfants perdus) – (France/Germany/Spain)
Clockers, directed by Spike Lee
Clockwork Mice – (U.K.)
Clueless, directed by Amy Heckerling, starring Alicia Silverstone, Stacey Dash, Brittany Murphy, Paul Rudd
Cold Fever (Á köldum klaka) – (Iceland)
Coldblooded, starring Jason Priestley and Kimberly Williams
Colpo di luna (Moon Shadow), starring Nino Manfredi – (Italy)
A Comédia de Deus (God's Comedy) – (Portugal)
Congo, starring Laura Linney, Dylan Walsh, Ernie Hudson, Tim Curry
Copycat, directed by Jon Amiel, starring Sigourney Weaver, Holly Hunter, Dermot Mulroney, William McNamara, Harry Connick Jr.
Crimson Tide, directed by Tony Scott, starring Denzel Washington, Gene Hackman, Viggo Mortensen
The Crossing Guard, directed by Sean Penn, starring Jack Nicholson, Anjelica Huston, David Morse, Robin Wright
Cry, the Beloved Country, directed by Darrell Roodt, starring James Earl Jones, Richard Harris, Charles S. Dutton – (South Africa/United States)
Crying Freeman
The Cure, starring Brad Renfro
Cutthroat Island, directed by Renny Harlin, starring Geena Davis and Matthew Modine
Cyclo (Xích Lô) – (Vietnam/France/Hong Kong) – Golden Lion award

D
Dangerous Minds, starring Michelle Pfeiffer
The Day of the Beast (El día de la Bestia) – (Spain)
Dead Man, directed by Jim Jarmusch, starring Johnny Depp
Dead Man Walking, directed by Tim Robbins, starring Susan Sarandon and Sean Penn
Dead Presidents, starring Larenz Tate, Keith David, Chris Tucker
Deathmaker (Der Totmacher) – (Germany)
Demon Knight, starring Billy Zane
Deseret, a documentary directed by James Benning and narrated by Fred Gardner
Desperado, directed by Robert Rodriguez, starring Antonio Banderas and Salma Hayek
Destiny Turns on the Radio, starring Dylan McDermott, Nancy Travis, James Belushi, Quentin Tarantino
Devil in a Blue Dress, starring Denzel Washington, Jennifer Beals, Don Cheadle
Die Hard with a Vengeance, directed by John McTiernan, starring Bruce Willis, Jeremy Irons, Samuel L. Jackson
Dilwale Dulhania Le Jayenge (The Brave Hearted Will Take the Bride) – (India)
Dolores Claiborne, directed by Taylor Hackford, starring Kathy Bates, Jennifer Jason Leigh, David Strathairn, Christopher Plummer
Don Juan DeMarco, starring Johnny Depp, Marlon Brando, Faye Dunaway
Don't Cry, Nanking (Nánjīng yī jiǔ sān qī) – (China)
Don't Forget You're Going to Die (N'oublie pas que tu vas mourir), directed by and starring Xavier Beauvois – (France)
The Doom Generation
Down to Earth (Casa de Lava) – (Portugal)
Dracula: Dead and Loving It, directed by Mel Brooks, starring Leslie Nielsen, Peter MacNicol, Steven Weber, Harvey Korman and Brooks
Dust of Life (Poussières de vie) – (France/Algeria)

E
Eggs (Moe og far) – (Norway)
Élisa, starring Vanessa Paradis and Gérard Depardieu – (France)
The Englishman Who Went up a Hill but Came down a Mountain, starring Hugh Grant – (U.K.)
Empire Records, starring Liv Tyler, Renée Zellweger, Anthony LaPaglia, Robin Tunney, Maxwell Caulfield
Escape to Witch Mountain, starring Robert Vaughn
Everyone's Child – (Zimbabwe)

F
Fair Game, starring William Baldwin and Cindy Crawford
Fall Time, starring Mickey Rourke
Fallen Angels (Duo luo tian shi), directed by Wong Kar-wai – (Hong Kong)
Father of the Bride Part II, starring Steve Martin, Diane Keaton, Martin Short, Kimberly Williams-Paisley, Eugene Levy
First Knight, starring Sean Connery, Richard Gere, Julia Ormond
Flamenco, directed by Carlos Saura – (Spain)
The Flower of My Secret (La flor de mi secreto), directed by Pedro Almodóvar, starring Marisa Paredes – (Spain)
Fluke, starring Matthew Modine, Nancy Travis, Eric Stoltz
The Flying Dutchman (De Vliegende Hollander) – (Netherlands)
Forget Paris, directed by and starring Billy Crystal, with Debra Winger, Joe Mantegna, Julie Kavner, Cynthia Stevenson, Cathy Moriarty
Forgotten Silver, directed by Peter Jackson and Costa Botes – (New Zealand)
Four Rooms, anthology starring Tim Roth, Madonna, Valeria Golino, Antonio Banderas, Tamlyn Tomita, Jennifer Beals
Free Willy 2: The Adventure Home, directed by Dwight H. Little
French Kiss, directed by Lawrence Kasdan, starring Meg Ryan, Kevin Kline, Timothy Hutton
Friday, starring Ice Cube and Chris Tucker
Friendship's Field
From the Journals of Jean Seberg – a documentary directed by Mark Rappaport
Full Body Massage, directed by Nicolas Roeg, starring Mimi Rogers and Bryan Brown
Funny Bones, starring Oliver Platt, Lee Evans, Leslie Caron, Jerry Lewis

G
Gamera: Guardian of the Universe (Gamera: Daikaijū Kuchu Kessen) – (Japan)
The Garden (Záhrada) – (Slovakia)
The Gate of Heavenly Peace
Georgia, directed by Ulu Grosbard, starring Jennifer Jason Leigh and Mare Winningham
Get Shorty, directed by Barry Sonnenfeld, starring John Travolta, Gene Hackman, Rene Russo, Danny DeVito, James Gandolfini, Dennis Farina
Getting Any? (Minnā yatteru ka!), directed by Takeshi Kitano – (Japan)
Ghost in the Shell (Gōsuto In Za Sheru) – (Japan)
The Glass Shield, starring Ice Cube and Lori Petty
Go Now, starring Robert Carlyle – (U.K.)
Godzilla vs. Destoroyah (Gojira tai Desutoroia) – (Japan)
Gold Diggers: The Secret of Bear Mountain, starring Anna Chlumsky and Christina Ricci – (United States/Canada)
The Golden Girls (Shan shui you xiang feng) – (Hong Kong)
GoldenEye, starring Pierce Brosnan (as James Bond), with Sean Bean, Famke Janssen, Judi Dench – (U.K.)
Gonin (The Five), directed by Takishi Ishii, starring Kōichi Satō and Beat Takeshi – (Japan)
Good Men, Good Women (Hao nan hao nu) – (Japan/Taiwan)
A Goofy Movie, directed by Kevin Lima, starring Jason Marsden, Bill Farmer, Wallace Shawn, additional voices Dante Basco
The Grass Harp, starring Walter Matthau, Jack Lemmon, Mary Steenburgen, Sissy Spacek
Grumpier Old Men, starring Walter Matthau, Jack Lemmon, Ann-Margret, Sophia Loren
Guantanamera – (Cuba)
Guimba the Tyrant (Guimba, un tyrant, une époque) – (Mali/Burkina Faso/France)

H
Hackers, directed by Iain Softley, starring Jonny Lee Miller, Angelina Jolie, Fisher Stevens, Lorraine Bracco
La Haine (Hatred), directed by Mathieu Kassovitz and starring Vincent Cassel – (France)
Happiness Is in the Field (Le Bonheur est dans le pré), starring Michel Serrault – (France)
Harrison Bergeron (film), starring Sean Astin, Christopher Plummer and Eugene Levy
Haunted, starring Kate Beckinsale and Aidan Quinn – (U.K.)
Heat, directed by Michael Mann, starring Al Pacino, Robert De Niro, Val Kilmer, Ashley Judd, Jon Voight, Tom Sizemore, Amy Brenneman
Heavy, directed by James Mangold, starring Shelley Winters, Liv Tyler, Pruitt Taylor Vince
Heavyweights, directed by Steven Brill
Hello Cinema (Salaam Cinema), directed by Mohsen Makhmalbaf – (Iran)
Hideaway, starring Jeff Goldblum and Alicia Silverstone
Higher Learning, directed by John Singleton, starring Omar Epps, Ice Cube, Kristy Swanson, Jennifer Connelly, Laurence Fishburne
Hiroshima, directed by Koreyoshi Kurahara and Roger Spottiswoode – (Japan/Canada)
Home for the Holidays, directed by Jodie Foster, starring Holly Hunter, Anne Bancroft, Robert Downey Jr., Dylan McDermott, Steve Guttenberg
The Horseman on the Roof (Le hussard sur le toit), starring Juliette Binoche – (France)
Houseguest, starring Phil Hartman and Sinbad
How to Make an American Quilt, starring Winona Ryder, Anne Bancroft, Ellen Burstyn, Kate Nelligan, Alfre Woodard
The Hunted, starring Christopher Lambert, John Lone and Joan Chen

I
ID – (U.K.)
In the Mouth of Madness, directed by John Carpenter, starring Sam Neill, Julie Carmen, Jürgen Prochnow, David Warner, Charlton Heston
The Indian in the Cupboard, directed by Frank Oz, starring Hal Scardino, Litefoot, Richard Jenkins, Steve Coogan
Indictment: The McMartin Trial, starring James Woods, Mercedes Ruehl, Lolita Davidovich, Henry Thomas, Shirley Knight
Indira – (India)
Innocent Lies, starring Stephen Dorff – (U.K./France)
It Takes Two, directed by Andy Tennant, starring Mary-Kate and Ashley Olsen, Kirstie Alley, Steve Guttenberg

J
Jade, directed by William Friedkin, starring David Caruso, Linda Fiorentino, Chazz Palminteri, Michael Biehn, Angie Everhart
Jeeva – (Pakistan)
Jefferson in Paris, directed by James Ivory, starring Nick Nolte, Thandie Newton, Greta Scacchi, Gwyneth Paltrow
Jeffrey, starring Steven Weber, Michael T. Weiss, Patrick Stewart
The Jerky Boys: The Movie
Johnny Mnemonic, starring Keanu Reeves, Dolph Lundgren, Beat Takeshi, Ice-T – (United States/Canada)
Joseph, starring Ben Kingsley – (Italy/United States/Germany)
The Journey of August King
Judge Dredd, starring Sylvester Stallone, Armand Assante, Diane Lane, Rob Schneider, Max von Sydow
Jumanji, directed by Joe Johnston, starring Robin Williams, Bonnie Hunt, Kirsten Dunst, Bradley Pierce, David Alan Grier
Just Cause, starring Sean Connery, Laurence Fishburne, Blair Underwood, Kate Capshaw, Ed Harris

K
Kamikaze Taxi (Kamikaze takushî) – (Japan)
Karan Arjun, starring Raakhee and Salman Khan – (India)
Kicking and Screaming, starring Eric Stoltz and Olivia d'Abo
A Kid in King Arthur's Court, starring Thomas Ian Nicholas, Joss Ackland, Kate Winslet
Kids, starring Chloë Sevigny and Rosario Dawson
Kiss of Death, starring David Caruso, Samuel L. Jackson, Nicolas Cage, Stanley Tucci, Kathryn Erbe, Helen Hunt
Kura – (Japan)

L
Land and Freedom, directed by Ken Loach – (U.K./Spain)
The Land Before Time III: The Time of the Great Giving
A Last Note (Gogo no Yuigon-jo) – (Japan) – Japan Academy Prize for Picture of the Year
Last of the Dogmen, starring Tom Berenger and Barbara Hershey
Last Summer in the Hamptons, directed by Henry Jaglom, starring Viveca Lindfors, Martha Plimpton, Melissa Leo
The Last Supper, starring Cameron Diaz, Courtney B. Vance, Annabeth Gish
Leaving Las Vegas, directed by Mike Figgis, starring Nicolas Cage and Elisabeth Shue
Let It Be Me, starring Campbell Scott and Jennifer Beals
Like Grains of Sand (Nagisa no Shindobaddo) – (Japan)
Little Criminals – (Canada)
A Little Princess, starring Liesel Matthews and Eleanor Bron
Little Sister (Zusje) – (Netherlands)
Live Nude Girls, starring Kim Cattrall, Cynthia Stevenson, Dana Delany
Living in Oblivion, starring Steve Buscemi and Catherine Keener
Long Live the Queen (Lang Leve de Koningin) – (Netherlands)
Lord of Illusions (a.k.a. Clive Barker's Lord of Illusions), starring Scott Bakula
Losing Isaiah, starring Jessica Lange and Halle Berry
Love Letter – (Japan)
Lumière and Company, 40 shorts from 40 directors – (France/Spain/Sweden/Denmark)

M
Maborosi (A Trick of the Light) – (Japan)
Mad Dogs and Englishmen, aka Shameless, starring Elizabeth Hurley and C. Thomas Howell – (U.K.)
Mad Love, starring Drew Barrymore and Chris O'Donnell
Magic in the Water, starring Mark Harmon – (United States/Canada)
Magic Island, directed by Sam Irvin, starring Zachery Ty Bryan, and Andrew Divoff
Major Payne, starring Damon Wayans
Mallrats, directed by Kevin Smith, starring Jeremy London, Jason Lee, Shannen Doherty, Claire Forlani, Ben Affleck, Joey Lauren Adams
Man of the House, starring Chevy Chase, Farrah Fawcett, Jonathan Taylor Thomas
Margaret's Museum, starring Helena Bonham Carter – (U.K./Canada)
Memories (Memorîzu) – (Japan)
Message to Love: The Isle of Wight Festival, featuring Jimi Hendrix, Emerson, Lake & Palmer, The Who, The Doors and others
Miami Rhapsody, directed by David Frankel, starring Sarah Jessica Parker, Antonio Banderas, Mia Farrow
Midaq Alley (El callejón de los milagros), starring Salma Hayek – (Mexico)
Mighty Aphrodite, directed by and starring Woody Allen, with Mira Sorvino, Helena Bonham Carter
Miracle in Bosnia, directed by Dino Mustafić and Danis Tanović, written by Zlatko Topčić
Mighty Morphin Power Rangers: The Movie, directed by Bryan Spicer, starring Jason David Frank, Amy Jo Johnson, David Yost, Johnny Yong Bosch, Karan Ashley, and Steve Cardenas, written John Kamps Arne Olsen (United States)
Les Misérables, directed by Claude Lelouch, starring Jean-Paul Belmondo – (France) – Golden Globe Award for Best Foreign Language Film
Money Train, starring Woody Harrelson, Wesley Snipes, Jennifer Lopez
A Mongolian Tale (Hēi jùn mǎ) – (China)
A Month by the Lake, starring Vanessa Redgrave, Edward Fox, Uma Thurman – (UK/US)
Moonlight and Valentino, starring Elizabeth Perkins, Gwyneth Paltrow, Jon Bon Jovi, Kathleen Turner, Whoopi Goldberg
Mortal Kombat, directed by Paul W. S. Anderson, starring Robin Shou, Linden Ashby, Bridgette Wilson, Christopher Lambert, Cary-Hiroyuki Tagawa
Multi-Facial, short film directed, produced by and starring Vin Diesel
Murder in the First, starring Christian Slater and Kevin Bacon
My Family, starring Edward James Olmos, Esai Morales, Jimmy Smits

N
Napoleon, family film directed by Mario Andreacchio – (Australia)
Nasty Love (L'amore molesto) – (Italy)
Nelly and Mr. Arnaud, starring Emmanuelle Béart and Michel Serrault – (France)
The Net, starring Sandra Bullock, Jeremy Northam, Dennis Miller
Never Talk to Strangers, starring Rebecca De Mornay and Antonio Banderas
New Jersey Drive
Nick of Time, directed by John Badham, starring Johnny Depp and Christopher Walken
Nine Months, starring Hugh Grant, Julianne Moore, Tom Arnold, Joan Cusack, Jeff Goldblum, Robin Williams
Nixon, directed by Oliver Stone, starring Anthony Hopkins, James Woods, Joan Allen, David Hyde Pierce, Powers Boothe, Paul Sorvino
No Way Back, starring Russell Crowe
Le Nouveau monde (The New World) – (France)
Now and Then, starring Christina Ricci, Thora Birch, Gaby Hoffmann, Demi Moore, Melanie Griffith, Rosie O'Donnell

O
On the Beat (Min jing gu shi) – (China)
One Hundred and One Nights (Les Cent et Une Nuits de Simon Cinéma), directed by Agnès Varda, starring Michel Piccoli and Marcello Mastroianni – (France)
Operation Dumbo Drop, directed by Simon Wincer, starring Ray Liotta, Danny Glover, Denis Leary, Doug E. Doug
Othello, directed by Oliver Parker, starring Laurence Fishburne, Irène Jacob, Kenneth Branagh – (UK/US)
Outbreak, directed by Wolfgang Petersen, starring Dustin Hoffman, Rene Russo, Morgan Freeman
The Outpost (A részleg) – (Hungary)

P
P*U*L*S*E, featuring Pink Floyd – (U.K.)
Panther, directed by Mario Van Peebles, starring Kadeem Hardison, Bokeem Woodbine, Courtney B. Vance
Param Vir Chakra, starring Saeed Jaffrey – (India)
Pari – (Iran)
Party Girl – (U.S.), starring Parker Posey
El pasajero clandestino – (France/Spain)
The Passion of Darkly Noon, starring Brendan Fraser, Ashley Judd, Viggo Mortensen – (Belgium/Germany/U.K.)
The Pebble and the Penguin, directed by Don Bluth – (Ireland/United States)
Peculiarities of the National Hunt (Osobennosti natsionalnoy okhoty) – (Russia)
A Personal Journey with Martin Scorsese Through American Movies, directed by Martin Scorsese (documentary)
Persuasion, starring Amanda Root and Ciarán Hinds – (UK/US)
Picture Bride – Sundance Film Festival Audience Award winner
Pocahontas, directed by Mike Gabriel and Eric Goldberg
Powder, starring Sean Patrick Flanery, Mary Steenburgen, Lance Henriksen, Jeff Goldblum
The Power Within, starring Karen Valentine
Premeditated Murder (Ubistvo s predumišljajem) – (Yugoslavia)
The Promise (Das Versprechen), directed by Margarethe von Trotta – (Germany)
The Prophecy, starring Christopher Walken, Elias Koteas, Virginia Madsen, Eric Stoltz
The Purse Snatcher (De Tasjesdief) – (Netherlands)

Q
O Quatrilho (The Foursome) – (Brazil)
The Quick and the Dead, directed by Sam Raimi, starring Sharon Stone, Gene Hackman, Russell Crowe, Leonardo DiCaprio

R
Rain Clouds over Wushan (Wu Shan Yun Yu) – (China)
Rangeela, directed by Ram Gopal Varma – (India)
Reckless, starring Mia Farrow and Scott Glenn
Red Cherry (Hóng yīng táo) – (China)
Restoration, starring Robert Downey Jr.
Richard III, directed by Richard Loncraine, starring Ian McKellen, Annette Bening, Robert Downey Jr. – (U.K.)
Rob Roy, directed by Michael Caton-Jones, starring Liam Neeson, Jessica Lange, John Hurt, Tim Roth
Roommates, starring Peter Falk, D. B. Sweeney, Julianne Moore
Rumble in the Bronx (Hong faan kui), starring Jackie Chan – (Hong Kong)

S
Sabrina, directed by Sydney Pollack, starring Harrison Ford, Julia Ormond, Greg Kinnear, Lauren Holly, Richard Crenna, Angie Dickinson
Safe, starring Julianne Moore – (UK/US)
Sailor Moon SuperS: The Movie (Black-Dream-Hole no kiseki) – (Japan)
The Scarlet Letter, directed by Roland Joffé, starring Demi Moore, Gary Oldman, Robert Duvall
Screamers, starring Peter Weller – (United States/Canada)
Search and Destroy, starring Griffin Dunne, Rosanna Arquette, Illeana Douglas, Christopher Walken, John Turturro, Dennis Hopper
The Second Time (La seconda volta) – (Italy)
See You in the Obituary (Vidimo se u čitulji) – (Yugoslavia)
Sense and Sensibility, directed by Ang Lee, starring Emma Thompson, Kate Winslet, Alan Rickman, Hugh Grant – (U.K.) – Golden Globe Award for Best Picture (Drama) and Golden Bear award (for 1996)
Seven (also known as Se7en), directed by David Fincher, starring Morgan Freeman, Brad Pitt, Gwyneth Paltrow, Kevin Spacey
Shanghai Triad (Yao a yao yao dao waipo qiao), directed by Zhang Yimou, starring Gong Li – (China)
Sharaku – (Japan)
Shirli-Myrli (What a Mess) – (Russia)
Showgirls, directed by Paul Verhoeven, starring Elizabeth Berkley, Kyle MacLachlan, Gina Gershon
Siao Yu, directed by Sylvia Chang – (Taiwan)
A Single Girl (La Fille seule), directed by Benoît Jacquot – (France)
A Single Spark (Jeon tae-il) – (South Korea)
Sister My Sister, starring Joely Richardson, Jodhi May and Julie Walters – (U.K.)
Smoke, starring Harvey Keitel and William Hurt
The Snails' Senator (Senatorul melcilor) – (Romania)
Something to Talk About, starring Julia Roberts, Dennis Quaid, Robert Duvall, Gena Rowlands, Kyra Sedgwick
Species, directed by Roger Donaldson and starring Natasha Henstridge, Ben Kingsley, Michael Madsen, Forest Whitaker, Alfred Molina
Spin, directed by Brian Springer
The Star Maker (L'Uomo delle stelle), directed by Giuseppe Tornatore – (Italy)
The Stars Fell on Henrietta, starring Robert Duvall
Steal Big Steal Little, directed by Andrew Davis, starring Andy García, Alan Arkin, Joe Pantoliano, Rachel Ticotin
Stonewall
Strange Days, directed by Kathryn Bigelow, starring Ralph Fiennes, Angela Bassett, Juliette Lewis
Sudden Death, starring Jean-Claude Van Damme
Summer Snow (Loey Yen Sei Seup) – (Hong Kong)

T
Tales from the Hood, starring Clarence Williams III, Joe Torry, Rosalind Cash, David Alan Grier, Lamont Bentley
Tall Tale, starring Patrick Swayze, Nick Stahl, Oliver Platt, Roger Aaron Brown, Scott Glenn
Tank Girl, starring Lori Petty, Malcolm McDowell, Naomi Watts, Ice-T
Things to Do in Denver When You're Dead, directed by Gary Fleder, starring Andy García, Treat Williams, Christopher Lloyd, Gabrielle Anwar, Christopher Walken
Those Were the Days (Le plus bel âge...) – (France)
Three Wishes, directed by Martha Coolidge, starring Patrick Swayze and Mary Elizabeth Mastrantonio
The Tie That Binds, starring Daryl Hannah, Keith Carradine, Moira Kelly, Vincent Spano
To Die For, directed by Gus Van Sant, starring Nicole Kidman, Joaquin Phoenix, Matt Dillon, Illeana Douglas
To Wong Foo, Thanks for Everything! Julie Newmar, starring Patrick Swayze, Wesley Snipes, John Leguizamo, Stockard Channing, Chris Penn
Tokyo Fist (Tokyo Ken) – (Japan)
Tom and Huck, directed by Peter Hewitt, starring Jonathan Taylor Thomas, and Brad Renfro
Tommy Boy, starring Chris Farley, David Spade, Rob Lowe, Bo Derek, Brian Dennehy, Dan Aykroyd
Tot Ziens (Goodbye) – (Netherlands)
Toy Story, voices of Tom Hanks and Tim Allen, directed by John Lasseter, first computer-animated feature-length film
Les Trois Frères (The Three Brothers) – (France)
Tropical Fish (Redai yu) – (Taiwan)
Truman, starring Gary Sinise, Diana Scarwid, Pat Hingle, Harris Yulin, Tony Goldwyn
Two Bits, starring Al Pacino
Two Deaths, directed by Nicolas Roeg, starring Michael Gambon and Sônia Braga – (U.K.)

U
Ulysses' Gaze (To Vlemma tou Odyssea), starring Harvey Keitel – (Greece)
Under the Domim Tree (Etz Hadomim Tafus) – (Israel)
Underground (Podzemlje) – (Yugoslavia) – Palme d'Or award
The Underneath, directed by Steven Soderbergh, starring Peter Gallagher
Unstrung Heroes, directed by Diane Keaton, starring Andie MacDowell, John Turturro, Michael Richards
Unzipped, a documentary on fashion industry
The Usual Suspects, directed by Bryan Singer, starring Gabriel Byrne, Stephen Baldwin, Benicio del Toro, Kevin Pollak, Chazz Palminteri, Kevin Spacey

V
Vampire in Brooklyn, directed by Wes Craven, starring Eddie Murphy and Angela Bassett
Village of the Damned, directed by John Carpenter, starring Christopher Reeve, Kirstie Alley, Linda Kozlowski, Mark Hamill
Virtuosity, starring Denzel Washington, Kelly Lynch, Russell Crowe

W
Waati, directed by Souleymane Cissé – (Mali)
Waiting to Exhale, directed by Forest Whitaker, starring Whitney Houston, Angela Bassett, Loretta Devine, Lela Rochon
A Walk in the Clouds, directed by Alfonso Arau, starring Keanu Reeves, Giancarlo Giannini, Anthony Quinn – (United States/Mexico)
The Walking Dead
Waterworld, directed by Kevin Reynolds, starring Kevin Costner, Dennis Hopper, Jeanne Tripplehorn, Tina Majorino
Weekend Lover (Zhou mo qing ren) – (China)
Welcome to the Dollhouse, directed by Todd Solondz, starring Heather Matarazzo
When Night Is Falling – (Canada)
While You Were Sleeping, directed by Jon Turteltaub, starring Sandra Bullock, Bill Pullman, Peter Gallagher
Whisper of the Heart (Mimi o Sumaseba) – (Japan)
The White Balloon (Badkonake sefid) – (Iran)
White Man's Burden, starring John Travolta and Harry Belafonte
Who's Counting? Marilyn Waring on Sex, Lies and Global Economics – (Canada)
The Wife, starring Tom Noonan, Julie Hagerty, Wallace Shawn, Karen Young
Wild Bill, directed by Walter Hill, starring Jeff Bridges, Ellen Barkin, David Arquette, Keith Carradine, John Hurt
Wild Side, starring Christopher Walken, Anne Heche, Joan Chen

Z
Zero Kelvin (Kjærlighetens kjøtere), starring Stellan Skarsgård – (Norway)

Births
 January 7
Leslie Grace, American singer, songwriter and actress
Hadley Robinson, American actress
 January 9 - Nicola Peltz, American actress
 January 11 - Claire Julien, former American actress
 January 13
Natalia Dyer, American actress
Eros Vlahos, English-Greek actor and comedian
 January 24
Dylan Everett, Canadian actor
Callan McAuliffe, Australian actor
 January 30 - Danielle Campbell, American actress
 February 2 - Tom Blyth, English actor
 February 7 - Tom Glynn-Carney, English actor and singer
 February 10 – Archie Madekwe, English actor
 February 28 - Madisen Beaty, American actress
 March 4 - Bill Milner, English actor
 March 7 - Haley Lu Richardson, American actress
 March 21 - RJ Cyler, American actor
 March 22 - Nick Robinson, American actor
 March 23 - Victoria Pedretti, American actress
 March 30 - Simone Ashley, English actress
 April 1 - Logan Paul, American pro wrestler, actor, and youtuber
 April 17 - Phoebe Dynevor, English actress
 April 19 - Patrick Gibson, Irish actor
 May 3 - Katie Chang, American actress
 May 4
Alex Lawther, English actor
Shameik Moore, American actor, singer and rapper
 May 12 - Sawyer Sweeten, American child actor (died 2015)
 May 13 - Taylor John Smith, American actor
 June 5 - Troye Sivan, South African-born Australian singer-songwriter, actor and YouTuber
 June 6 - Jack Kilmer, American actor
 June 8 - Harumi Sato, Japanese actress and dancer
 June 19 - Blake Woodruff, American actor
 June 20 - Geraldine Viswanathan, Australian actress
 June 22 - Micheál Richardson, Irish-American actor
 July 4 - Post Malone, American rapper
 July 9 - Georgie Henley, English actress
 July 11 - Blu Hunt, American actress
 July 12 - Mason Alexander Park, American actor
 August 4 - Bruna Marquezine, Brazilian actress
 August 7 - Sasha Calle, American actress
 August 9 - Justice Smith, American actor
 August 20 - Liana Liberato, American actress
 August 22 - Dua Lipa, English singer and actress
 September 12 - Ryan Potter, American actor
 September 22 - Juliette Goglia, American actress
 September 29 - Sasha Lane, American actress
 October 10 - Da'Vinchi, Haitian–American actor and rapper
 October 24 - Ashton Sanders, American actor and model
 November 7 - Sophia Ali, American actress
 November 9 - Finn Cole, English actor
 November 22 - Katherine McNamara, American actress
 November 23 - Austin Majors, American actor (died 2023)
 November 27
Ricardo Hoyos, Canadian actor
Jamila Velazquez, American singer and actress
 November 29 - Laura Marano, American actress, singer
 December 13 - Emma Corrin, English actress
 December 27
Laurence Belcher, English actor
Timothée Chalamet, American and French actor
 December 29 - Ross Lynch, American actor, singer, dancer

Deaths

Film debuts
Jon Abrahams – Kids
Casey Affleck – To Die For
Adewale Akinnuoye-Agbaje – Congo
Michael Bay (director) – Bad Boys
Drake Bell – Drifting School
Connie Britton – The Brothers McMullen
Edward Burns – The Brothers McMullen
Scott Caan – A Boy Called Hate
Emmanuelle Chriqui – The Donor
Hayden Christensen – In the Mouth of Madness
Rachael Leigh Cook – The Baby-Sitters Club
Jennifer Coolidge – Not of This Earth
David Cross – Destiny Turns on the Radio
Rosario Dawson – Kids
Peter Dinklage – Living in Oblivion
Colman Domingo – Timepiece
Jeffrey Donovan – Throwing Down
Minnie Driver – Circle of Friends
Michael Clarke Duncan – Friday
Peter Facinelli – Angela
Colin Farrell – Frankie Starlight
Will Ferrell – Criminal Hearts
Tommy Flanagan – Braveheart
Shawn Hatosy – Home for the Holidays
Natasha Henstridge – Species
Hassan Johnson – Clockers
Tamala Jones – How to Make an American Quilt
Keira Knightley – Innocent Lies
Johnny Knoxville – Desert Blues
David Koechner – It's Now... or NEVER!
Jared Leto – How to Make an American Quilt
Ken Leung – Pictures of Baby Jane Doe
Norm MacDonald – Billy Madison
Heather Matarazzo – Welcome to the Dollhouse
James McAvoy – The Near Room
Debra Messing – A Walk in the Clouds
Ivana Miličević – Children of the Corn III: Urban Harvest
Jay Mohr – For Better or Worse
Paula Jai Parker – Friday
Amanda Peet – Animal Room
Mekhi Phifer – Clockers
Ryan Phillippe – Crimson Tide
James Purefoy – Feast of July
Jeremy Renner – National Lampoon's Senior Trip
Giovanni Ribisi – Mind Ripper
Paul Rudd – Clueless
Peter Sarsgaard – Dead Man Walking
Steve Schirripa – Casino
Chloë Sevigny – Kids
Brendan Sexton III – Welcome to the Dollhouse
Michael Sheen – Othello
Ethan Suplee – Mallrats
Saïd Taghmaoui – La Haine
Charlize Theron – Children of the Corn III: Urban Harvest
James Van Der Beek – Angus
Dominic West – Richard III

References 

 
Film by year